Xiphophorus nigrensis, the Panuco swordtail, is a species of fish in the family Poeciliidae that is endemic to a small part of the Pánuco River basin in Mexico.

References

nigrensis
Taxa named by Donn Eric Rosen
Fish described in 1960